Shah Makan-e Sefer (also Romanized as Shāh Makān-e Sefer; also known as Shāh Makān-e Soflá and Shāmkān-e Soflá) is a village in Zaz-e Sharqi Rural District, Zaz va Mahru District, Aligudarz County, Lorestan Province, Iran. At the 2006 census, its population was 158, in 26 families.

References 

Towns and villages in Aligudarz County